Classic Rock, produced by Jeff Jarratt and Don Reedman, is the first album in the Classic Rock series by London Symphony Orchestra. It was released on 1 July 1978 by K-Tel International, and entered the UK Albums Chart on 8 July 1978, rising to number 3 and staying in the charts for 39 weeks. The album gained platinum certification from the British Phonographic Industry on 10 November 1978. The album was recorded at EMI Abbey Road Studios on 15–16 October 1976. A further nine albums in the series followed, between 1979 and 1992.

Track listing

Side one
"Bohemian Rhapsody" (Freddie Mercury) – 6:23
"Life on Mars?" (David Bowie) – 4:19
"A Whiter Shade of Pale" (Gary Brooker, Keith Reid) – 3:51
"Whole Lotta Love" (John Paul Jones, Jimmy Page, John Bonham, Robert Plant) – 4:28
"Paint It Black" (Mick Jagger, Keith Richards) – 5:27

Side two
"Nights in White Satin" (Justin Hayward) – 4:49
"Lucy in the Sky With Diamonds" (John Lennon, Paul McCartney) – 6:06
"Without You" (Thomas Evans, Peter Ham) – 3:53
"I'm Not in Love" (Graham Gouldman, Eric Stewart) – 7:30
"Sailing" (Gavin Sutherland) – 4:56

All tracks arranged and conducted by Andrew Pryce Jackman except:
Track 3 on side 1: Arranged and conducted by Martyn Ford
Tracks 3 & 4 on side 2: Arranged by Ann Odell, conducted by Martyn Ford

Personnel
The London Symphony Orchestra
The Royal Choral Society
Anthony Camden – Chairman of LSO
Neville Taweel – Leader of LSO
Michael De Grey
The Rhythm Section
Les Hurdle
Clem Cattini
Paul Keogh
Nigel Jenkins
Ricky Hitchcock
Alan Parker
Mike Moran
Frank Ricotti
Tristan Fry
Chris Karan
Peter Straker – Solo vocal on "Bohemian Rhapsody"
David Bell – Organ solo on "A Whiter Shade of Pale"

Charts

Weekly charts

Year-end charts

References 

Rock albums by British artists
London Symphony Orchestra albums
1977 debut albums
Classical crossover albums
K-tel albums